War Game is a children's novel about World War I written and illustrated by Michael Foreman and published by Pavilion in 1993. It features four young English soldiers and includes football with German soldiers during the Christmas truce, "temporary relief from the brutal and seemingly endless struggle in the trenches".

War Game won the 1993 Nestlé Children's Book Prize in ages category 6–8 years and overall. Foreman was a commended runner up for the annual Greenaway Medal from the Library Association, recognising the best children's book illustration by a British subject.

In 2002 the book was adapted as a short animated film by the same name by the British animation company Illuminated Films.

Summary 
Will, Freddie, Billy, and Lacey are our young friends eager for "the grand adventure" of old-fashioned war. The story follows them through training in England, arrival in France and the trenches, the famous 1914 Christmas truce, and the Battle of the Somme. At key points in the story, the author includes historical information on particular events of the war.

The main characters are named after and based on Foreman's uncles who were killed in the war at ages 18 to 24. He was born about twenty years later in 1938.

Notes

References

External links 

 

1993 British novels
1993 children's books
British children's novels
Children's historical novels
Novels set during World War I